The 2002 Yale Bulldogs football team represented Yale University in the 2002 NCAA Division I-AA football season.  The Bulldogs were led by sixth-year head coach Jack Siedlecki, played their home games at the Yale Bowl and finished tied for third in the Ivy League with a 4–3 record, 6–4 overall.

Schedule

References

Yale
Yale Bulldogs football seasons
Yale Bulldogs football